Nils Gunnar Nordahl (19 October 1921 – 15 September 1995) was a Swedish professional footballer. A highly prolific, powerful, and physically strong striker, with an eye for goal, he is best known for his spell at AC Milan from 1949 to 1956, in which he won the Scudetto twice, and also the title of pluricapocannoniere, with an unprecedented five top scorer (Capocannonieri) awards, more than any other player in the history of the Italian championship.

Nordahl is Milan’s all-time record goalscorer, and he long held the record for most goals for a single club in the history of Italian league, before being surpassed by Francesco Totti in January 2012. He still holds the record for goals per appearance in Italy.

A full international between 1942 and 1948, he won 33 caps and scored 43 goals for the Sweden national team. He represented his country at the 1948 Summer Olympics, where he was the joint top scorer alongside Denmark's John Hansen as Sweden won gold.

Nordahl is considered to be one of the greatest Swedish football players of all-time, and regarded as one of the best strikers in football history. In 2017, he was included in FourFourTwo magazine's list of the 100 greatest players of all time, at the 54th position.

He is the father of former footballer Thomas Nordahl.

Club career

Sweden

Nordahl started out at Hörnefors IF in Sweden before moving to first Degerfors IF and then IFK Norrköping. He won four Swedish championships with IFK Norrköping and once scored seven goals in one game. During his time in Swedish clubs, Nordahl scored 149 goals in 172 matches.

Italy
Nordahl transferred to AC Milan on 22 January 1949. Later, he would team up with his national team strike partners, Gunnar Gren and Nils Liedholm to form the renowned Gre-No-Li trio. Playing eight seasons with Milan, he is  Serie A's multi-top-scorer a record five times (1949–50, 1950–51, 1952–53, 1953–54 and 1954–55). Nordahl is also Milan's all-time top-scorer, with 210 league goals.

Nordahl is the third-highest Serie A goalscorer of all time, with 225 goals in 291 matches, only behind Silvio Piola and Francesco Totti. That makes Nordahl the top goalscorer among non-Italian players, and he is also the most efficient goalscorer  goals in Serie A ever with 0.77 goals/match. He was nicknamed il pompiere (the fireman), because of his former job while he played in Sweden.

After leaving Milan, Nordahl played for Roma for two seasons. Nordahl's record for most goals scored in Serie A (not including Divisione Nazionale, before Serie A was installed) of 35 in 1949–50 in a season was broken by Gonzalo Higuaín in the 2015–16 season who scored 36. Nordahl, together with the mentioned Gre-No-Li is today legendary in Milan. When Milan striker Andriy Shevchenko scored his 100 goal in Serie A for Milan, it is said that some old Milanese supporters commented: "Well he can double that number, and then add another 26, then, and just then, he has passed Il Cannoniere."

International career
Nordahl was first called up to the Swedish national team in 1942. In 1948, he helped Sweden to win the Olympic football tournament, becoming the tournament's top scorer on the way. The Swedish team also included his brothers Bertil and Knut Nordahl. Nordahl's transfer to Milan forced him to retire from the national team, as the rules at the time prevented professionals from the Swedish national team, being not called to 1950 FIFA World Cup along his fellows Gren and Liedholm. In his 33 matches in the national team, he scored a total of 43 goals.

Career statistics

Club

International

Scores and results list Sweden's goal tally first, score column indicates score after each Nordahl goal.

Honours
IFK Norrköping
 Allsvenskan: 1944–45, 1945–46, 1946–47, 1947–48
 Swedish Cup: 1945

AC Milan
 Serie A: 1950–51, 1954–55
 Latin Cup: 1950–51, 1955–56

Sweden
 Olympic Gold Medal: 1948
 Nordic Football Championship: 1937–1947

Individual
 Allsvenskan top scorer: 1942–43, 1944–45, 1945–46, 1947–48
 Swedish Footballer of the Year: 1947
 Olympic Games Top Scorer: 1948
 Italian Serie A Top Scorer: 1949–50, 1950–51, 1952–53, 1953–54, 1954–55
 AC Milan Hall of Fame
 Nordic Football Championship top scorer: 1937–1947
Records
 Most goals scored for AC Milan: 221
 Most Italian Serie A Top Scorer titles: 5
 Most consecutive Italian Serie A Top Scorer titles: 3 (record shared with Michel Platini)
 Most braces scored in Serie A: 49 (record shared with Silvio Piola)
 Most hat-tricks scored in Serie A: 17 (all with AC Milan)

See also
 List of men's footballers with 500 or more goals

References

External links

 Gunnar Nordahl – Classic Player profile – [FIFA.com]
 List of Swedish Players and Coaches in Italy since 1945 – RSSSF
 Detail of international appearances and goals – by Roberto Mamrud, RSSSF
 Profile at magliarossonera.it 
 Biography at Storie di Calcio 
 Obituary in la Repubblica
 

1921 births
1995 deaths
Sportspeople from Umeå
Swedish footballers
Association football forwards
Degerfors IF players
IFK Norrköping players
A.C. Milan players
A.S. Roma players
Allsvenskan players
Serie A players
Olympic footballers of Sweden
Sweden international footballers
Footballers at the 1948 Summer Olympics
Olympic gold medalists for Sweden
Medalists at the 1948 Summer Olympics
Olympic medalists in football
Swedish expatriate footballers
Swedish expatriate sportspeople in Italy
Expatriate footballers in Italy
Swedish football managers
A.S. Roma managers
Degerfors IF managers
IFK Norrköping managers
AIK Fotboll managers
Östers IF managers
Serie A managers
Allsvenskan managers
Swedish expatriate football managers
Expatriate football managers in Italy